Mesophleps corsicella is a moth of the family Gelechiidae. It is found in Spain (including the Balearic Islands), Portugal, France and Italy, Greece and on Corsica, Sardinia and Sicily. Outside of Europe, it is found in Morocco and Lebanon.

The wingspan is 11–17.5 mm. The forewings are greyish yellow, densely scattered with dark brown scales.

The larvae feed on Helianthemum species (including Helianthemum tuberosum), Cistus ladaniferus and possibly Cistus salviifolius and Cistus laurifolius.

References

Moths described in 1856
Mesophleps
Moths of Europe